Sergeant George Marsh (died June 18, 1915) was an American soldier who fought in the American Civil War. Marsh received his country's highest award for bravery during combat, the Medal of Honor. Marsh's medal was won for capturing a stockade and saving a bridge over the Elk River in Tennessee on July 2, 1863. He was honored with the award on September 17, 1897.

Marsh was born in Brookfield, Illinois, where he entered service, and was buried in Ottawa, Illinois.

Medal of Honor citation

See also
 List of American Civil War Medal of Honor recipients: M–P

References

19th-century American people
1915 deaths
Year of birth unknown
American Civil War recipients of the Medal of Honor
People from Brookfield, Illinois
People of Illinois in the American Civil War
Union Army soldiers
United States Army Medal of Honor recipients